Junior Campbell (born William Campbell Jnr, 31 May 1947) is a Scottish composer, songwriter and musician.  He was a founding member, lead guitarist, piano player, and singer with the Scottish band Marmalade and co-wrote and produced some of their biggest successes, including "Reflections of My Life", "I See the Rain" and "Rainbow".
 
"Reflections of My Life" has produced sales of over two million units.  In 1998 Campbell and co-writer Dean Ford (Thomas McAleese) were awarded a Special Citation of Achievement by the BMI for attaining radio broadcast performances in excess of one million in the US alone.
He also wrote and produced his own solo hits, Hallelujah Freedom and Sweet Illusion and "Carolina Days". 
Campbell is also known for composing music for film and television drama, and as an arranger and producer for many musicians including Barbara Dickson. He is also known for co-composing the music and co-writing the lyrics for 182 episodes and 31 songs of the children's TV series Thomas & Friends from 1983–2003,  including "The Island Song", "He's A Really Useful Engine", "The Snow Song" and "Accidents Happen", and also composing the music for Tugs, a thirteen part children's television series from the same production crew as Thomas.

Early life
Campbell was born in Glasgow, Scotland. He grew up in Springboig, in the east end of Glasgow, and was educated at Thorntree Primary in Greenfield and Eastbank Academy in Shettleston.  His paternal grandfather Alfredo Cancellari was an Italian immigrant born near Lucca, Italy, who changed his surname to Campbell in the early 1900s when he settled in Scotland.

As a youngster, Campbell had a distinct unique style of guitar playing, whereby, similar to Albert King and Dick Dale, he played right hand guitar, left-handed, literally upside down without changing the stringing, {unlike Jimi Hendrix and Paul McCartney who restrung to conventional stringing}, although he tuned to "open E" tuning (List of guitar tunings) rather than standard Guitar tuning. He joined Pat Fairley to form The Gaylords, on his fourteenth birthday in May 1961 (later to become Dean Ford & the Gaylords, then Marmalade in 1966), acting as lead guitarist, piano player, and singer.

Career
With Marmalade, he co-wrote and produced the multi-million-selling "Reflections of My Life", "Rainbow" and "I See The Rain", amongst others, in a line of hits from 1967 to 1971. Campbell's reverse tape guitar solo on "Reflections of My Life" and "I See the Rain" are particularly noteworthy – the latter was Jimi Hendrix's favourite cut of 1967.

During his years with Marmalade, the band used Keith Mansfield as an orchestral arranger on all of their first record successes with CBS, including "Loving Things", "Wait For Me Mary Ann", "Obladi Oblada", "Baby Make It Soon" and also "Reflections of My Life", when the band moved to Decca, and Campbell studied Mansfield's scores at close range, was so impressed with the craft of arranging for orchestra, and the sound and expertise of orchestral musicians in the recording studio, that this led to a major turning point in his career, so much so, he then commenced arranging orchestral accompaniment on the band's sessions himself.

Tired of touring, Campbell left Marmalade in March 1971.

During the 1970s, he had two self-penned solo records released, both of which, "Hallelujah Freedom" (#9) (1972), (with Doris Troy on backing vocals), and "Sweet Illusion" (#15) (1973), made Top 20 chart appearances in the UK Singles Chart.

He then went on to study orchestration and composition with Eric Gilder and Max Saunders at the Royal College of Music and became an arranger and record producer for many artists as diverse as Miller Anderson, (Bright City, 1971), Matthews Southern Comfort, Barry Ryan, The Tremeloes, Freddie Starr and Barbara Dickson, arranging and producing her first hit single and album, "Answer Me". He also arranged and conducted Dickson's performances in her first-season run on the BBC Television series The Two Ronnies in 1976.

Campbell has composed music for television drama and film, including the 1989 war film That Summer of White Roses (starring Tom Conti and Rod Steiger, Susan George and Alun Armstrong); the 1993 fantasy film Merlin: The True Story (aka October 32nd, starring Nadia Cameron-Blakey, James Hong, Richard Lynch and Rodney Wood) and the 1994 BBC Worldwide Television drama BAFTA winner Taking Over the Asylum, which starred Ken Stott, David Tennant and Elizabeth Spriggs.

He also composed the music for the 1998 BBC Television adaptation of the Minette Walters murder mystery The Scold's Bridle, starring Miranda Richardson, Bob Peck, Siân Phillips, Douglas Hodge, Trudie Styler, and Beth Winslet.

Campbell co-wrote the music and lyrics for the internationally successful children's TV series Thomas the Tank Engine and Friends and TUGS with Mike O'Donnell, composing all music and songs during the classic period of Thomas films from 1984–2003, but when ownership of the production changed hands in 2003 during season 7 for the British dub, Campbell (and his co-writer) departed the series after becoming embroiled in what proved to be a protracted legal dispute in a claim to recover substantial historic royalties with HIT Entertainment, the new owners.
 
Campbell lives near Horsham in Sussex with his wife Susie.

In November 2013, Junior Campbell – The Very Best Of .... Back Then was released through Union Square Music. It was a 32 track compilation album available for digital download.

Discography

Singles

 All songs written by Junior Campbell – except  "Baby Hold On" (co-written with Len (Chip) Hawkes)

Albums
 Second Time Around – 1974 – Deram Records SML 1106
 Second Time Around – 2001 – Sanctuary Records CMDDD 398 compilation containing original Deram album and all Deram/Private Stock singles, plus selection of previously unreleased tracks.

Singles with The Marmalade (including Dean Ford and The Gaylords)

Dean Ford and the Gaylords singles

Marmalade singles

References

Other sources
 Discography ref Record Collector issue No. 186 (February 1995)
 Liner notes Second Time Around – 2001 – Sanctuary Records CMDDD 398

External links
 

1947 births
Living people
Parkhead
Scottish keyboardists
Scottish songwriters
Musicians from Glasgow
Scottish composers
Scottish pop guitarists
Scottish male guitarists
Scottish pianists
20th-century Scottish male singers
Scottish people of Italian descent
Deram Records artists
Rocket Records artists
People educated at Eastbank Academy
British male pianists
20th-century British guitarists
20th-century British pianists
Private Stock Records artists
British male songwriters